Adam Drucker (born April 21, 1977), better known by his stage name Doseone, is an American rapper, producer, poet and artist. He is a co-founder of the indie hip hop record label Anticon. He has also been a member of numerous groups including Deep Puddle Dynamics, Greenthink, Clouddead, Themselves, Subtle, 13 & God, Go Dark, Nevermen, and A7pha.

History 
Doseone is known for his extensive collaborations with other Anticon members, forming numerous groups and performing guest spots on others' releases. He has recorded with many musicians including Mr. Dibbs, Aesop Rock, Slug, Sole, Alias, Jel, Odd Nosdam, Why?, Fog, Boom Bip, The Notwist and Mike Patton. He has also released several solo albums, including the spoken word album Soft Skulls and a combination audio CD and poetry book The Pelt.

Early in his musical career, Doseone once competed in a freestyle rap battle with then-unknown Eminem at Scribble Jam in 1997. In 1998, Doseone released his first solo album, Hemispheres. In 2000, he released Circle, a collaborative album with producer Boom Bip. In 2012, he released the solo album, G Is for Deep, on Anticon.

Doseone is also a visual artist. He has worked on the cover art for many of the albums he has performed on. He has contributed the artwork on Jel's album Soft Money in 2006. He has also done work in animation. He worked on an online animated cartoon NOTGarfield. The series consists of characters from Garfield involved in surreal dada situations.

In January 2012 it was announced that Adult Swim has ordered a pilot of an animated series called Mars Safari that will feature a soundtrack by Doseone and Jel. Doseone will star alongside Steve Little and Carl Weathers to voice the character Emilio.

Doseone has also participated in creating music for indie games, including Sludge Life, Samurai Gunn, Catacomb Kids, Enter the Gungeon, Vlambeer's games Gun Godz and Nuclear Throne, Messhof's Nidhogg 2, Disc Room and many other independent games currently in development.

Style 
Doseone is known for his nasal and high pitched voice, fast polyrhythmic rapping style, and extremely dense and abstract lyrics. His words tend to express upon topics of childhood, nature, and American life. While rapping/singing onstage, he often also simultaneously performs on the synthesizer, sampler, or keyboard.

A recurring character in much of Doseone's work is a man named Hour Hero Yes. He is mentioned in the 13 & God song "Ghostwork" as well as throughout albums of his band Subtle. Album and video artwork, as well as art on Subtle's official website, suggest Hour Hero Yes to be a bald man with a black and white striped face; an image which is embodied by a bust that serves as a centerpiece prop during live Subtle shows. On the cover of For Hero: For Fool, he appears in old military garb with fire for hair.

Discography

Studio albums
 Hemispheres (1998)
 It's Not Easy Being... (1998) (with Why?, as Greenthink)
 Blindfold (1999) (Greenthink)
 Slowdeath (1999)
 Circle (2000) (with Boom Bip)
 Object Beings (2001) (with Why? & Pedestrian, as Object Beings)
 Ha (2005)
 Soft Skulls (2007)
 Skeleton Repelent (2007)
 G Is for Deep (2012)
 Super Game Jam: Soundtrack (2014) (with Kuabee)
 0rbitalis: Soundtrack (2015)
 Enter the Gungeon: Soundtrack (2016)
 Disc Room: Soundtrack (2016)
 A7pha (2017) (with Mestizo, as A7pha)
 Less Is Orchestra (2018) (with Alias)
 SLUDGE LIFE (Original SoundTrack) (2020)
 G is for JOB (2020)
 A7pha II (2022) (with Mestizo, as A7pha)

Live albums
 Apogee (1997) (with Why?, Josiah & Mr. Dibbs, as Apogee)
 Be Evil (2009)

EPs
 Crazy Hitman Science (1999) (with Jel, Why?, et al., as Blud N Gutz)
 The Samurai Gunn (2013)
 Free Ring Tone of the Month Vol. I (2013)
 Bitchsword (2014) (with Ash, as Go Dark)
 Heavy Bullets (2014)
 Free Ring Tone of the Month Vol. II (2014)
 Brightwild (2015) (Go Dark)
 Hunt Me (2016) (Go Dark)

Singles
 "Attack of the Postmodern Pat Boones / Cannibalism of the Object Beings" (2000) (Object Beings)

Audio books
 The Pelt (2003)
 Unearthing (2010) (with Andrew Broder, as Crook & Flail)

References

External links
 
 

Living people
Anticon
Musicians from Cincinnati
Underground rappers
American male rappers
Rappers from Ohio
Midwest hip hop musicians
American hip hop record producers
1977 births
Lex Records artists